Drohiczyn (Dorohochyn, Dorohychyn) is a town in Siemiatycze County, Podlaskie Voivodeship, Poland. The town has a population of 2,110 and is situated on the bank of the Bug River. Drohiczyn has a long and rich history, as in the past it was one of the most important cities of the region of Podlachia. Currently, it is the seat of Roman Catholic Diocese of Drohiczyn.

History 
A Neolithic settlement, La Tène culture crematoria, and ancient graves have been uncovered in what now is Drohiczyn. Drohiczyn, regarded as one of the oldest towns of the region of Podlasie, was in ancient times located among dense forests.

Middle Ages 
In early Middle Ages, the town's territory was inhabited by the warring tribe of Yotvingians. It is not known who founded the Drohiczyn gord: it was most likely a defensive settlement of the Yotvingians, mentioned in Rus’ chronicles in 1061. In 1142, Grand Duke Vsevolod II of Kiev divided his realm between his family, granting Drohiczyn (as Dorohychin) and Brest to his younger brother Igor. Some time in late 12th century, Drohiczyn was under the Polish rule. On March 8, 1237, Duke Konrad I of Masovia handed Drohiczyn, together with the area between the Bug and the Narew, to the Order of Dobrzyń.

In 1241, taking advantage of the chaos which ensued after the Mongol Invasion of Poland, Lithuanian Grand Duke Mindaugas captured Podlasie together with Drohiczyn, Bielsk Podlaski, Mielnik, Brańsk and Suraż, annexing it into the Grand Duchy of Lithuania. The Rus dukes did not want to give up this region, and regained Drohiczyn after a few years. In 1251, Rus forces, gathered at Drohiczyn, invaded the Yotvingians. After a victorious war, the position of Duke Daniel of Galicia grew so strong that he was crowned the King of Ruthenia. This happened in Drohiczyn in 1253.

In 1274, Drohiczyn was again captured by the Lithuanians, and the town with whole province remained in Lithuania until the Union of Lublin (1569), with the exception in the 1380s and 1430s, when Drohiczyn was ruled by the Duke of Masovia Janusz.

Drohiczyn was one of major cities of the Grand Duchy of Lithuania, together with Trakai, Vilnius and Navahrudak. In the 15th century, most of town’s population was of Ruthenian heritage, with Polish, Jewish and Lithuanian minorities. In 1498, its position was officially recognized, when it was granted Magdeburg rights.

Early modern era 
During the reign of Sigismund I the Old, Drohiczyn was named capital and administrative seat of Podlasie Voivodeship, which was established in 1513. Local sejmiks took place here. At that time, the town experienced its golden age. In 1569 with the Union of Lublin, Drohiczyn was annexed to the Kingdom of Poland. The town continued to prosper, despite a plague outbreak in 1624, which decimated the population. Furthermore, in the 1630s there were two fires, in which several houses burned. Since mid-1630s, the population of Drohiczyn began to decline.

The Deluge 
The Deluge (1655–1660) brought widespread destruction and misery, after which Drohiczyn never recovered to its former greatness. Swedish soldiers, led by Magnus Gabriel De la Gardie appeared in the town in August 1655. They immediately looted Drohiczyn, ordering its residents to pay an enormous contribution. In late 1655, a unit of Crimean Tatars, allied with Poland, appeared in the area of Drohiczyn and spent whole winter here, looting all farms and the town.

On May 3, 1657, a Transilvanian army of George II Rákóczi, which also consisted of Swedes, Cossacks and Wallachians, captured Drohiczyn. Most of residents were brutally murdered, and the town, together with the parish church and the castle, was completely destroyed. Survivors fled to nearby forests, and the town virtually ceased to exist.

Great Northern War 
Drohiczyn slowly recovered from the destruction, but in 1699, it was burned again, this time by Saxon soldiers, who were on their way to Lithuania. The town suffered during the Great Northern War: hunger was widespread, and the marching armies of Sweden, Saxony, Russia, Poland and Lithuania looted Drohiczyn.

19th century 
Following the third partition of Poland, Drohiczyn was divided in 1795 between Habsburg Empire and the Kingdom of Prussia, as the new border went along the Bug river. On May 27, 1805, the town burned in a great fire, in which all archives, kept at the town hall, were lost forever. In 1807, the Duchy of Warsaw was created, and Drohiczyn was once again divided between the duchy and Russian Empire. In 1808, Russian authorities created Drohiczyn County, part of Grodno Governorate. In 1861, the population of both parts of Drohiczyn was 1700, with 1400 living in Polish district, and 300 inhabiting Ruthenian district. Residents of the town and its surroundings actively participated in the January Uprising.

Interbellum 
According to the 1921 census, the village was inhabited by 1.972 people, among whom 950 were Roman Catholic, 207 Orthodox, 1 Evangelical and 814 Mosaic. At the same time, 1.165 inhabitants declared Polish nationality, 114 Belarusian, 687 Jewish and 6 another. There were 289 residential buildings in the village. In the Second Polish Republic, Drohiczyn belonged to Bialystok Voivodeship.

World War II 
The town was briefly seized by the Wehrmacht during the Invasion of Poland, and on September 27, 1939, it was occupied by the Soviet Union. Until June 1941, Drohiczyn was a border town. The Soviet regime immediately began expelling the town's residents to Siberia. Those selected by the NKVD were ordered to march with their bags to the rail station at Siemiatycze, located 20 kilometers away. There they were loaded into freight cars and taken to Siberia, where most perished.

In the spring of 1940, the Soviet commandant of the town ordered all houses located within 800 meters from the river to be moved to other locations, for security reasons, as the Bug marked the border between the Soviet Union and the Third Reich. This order meant that most of Drohiczyn would cease to exist, as most houses and other buildings were located by the river. As a result, several historical structures were destroyed at that time, including two churches and a 17th-century manor house. The Soviets spared only the houses which were necessary for the border patrol and families of officers. Furthermore, the Soviet occupants devastated the local church, which was turned into stables, and a Benedictine abbey, which served as a warehouse of building materials. In search of gold and jewelry, Soviet soldiers destroyed tombs at the cemetery. The Russian language and Communist ideology were taught at local schools; several teachers were fired and arrested.

In November 1939, after a rigged referendum, Drohiczyn was annexed into the Soviet Belarus, and USSR passports were handed to local residents. This resulted in mass draft of teenagers into the Red Army, also a large group of 14- and 15-year-olds was sent to the heavy industry plants at Omsk; most of them never returned home. Drohiczyn turned into a ghost town, with heavy Soviet patrols guarding the border. After a few months of Soviet rule, almost all foodstuffs were scarce, and local residents had to smuggle them from Germany, at risk of their own life.

The German attack on June 22, 1941 took the residents of the town by surprise. Soviet authorities were also surprised, but before retreating, they managed to murder several men kept in the cellar of the abbey. As a result of an artillery barrage, many buildings were destroyed, and the ancient Franciscan church was damaged. Drohiczyn was quickly captured, and during the German occupation, the town was an important center of the Home Army and other partisan organizations. Local Jews were in the autumn of 1942 transported to the rail station at Siemiatycze, and then to Treblinka extermination camp. Until 1944, Drohiczyn remained a border town. Together with the whole Bezirk Bialystok, Drohiczyn belonged to East Prussia, while the General Government was located on the other side of the Bug. German authorities permitted local Poles to settle in the border area, they also allowed the church to be reopened.

The Red Army entered Drohiczyn without resistance on August 1, 1944. The Soviet authorities were met with apprehension, as the locals remembered the terror of 1939–1941, and feared that Drohiczyn would be reattached to Soviet Belarus. Polish administration was created, together with school system. The NKVD arrested several soldiers of the Home Army, sending them to Siberia. In autumn of 1946, the local network of Freedom and Independence was destroyed, and its leaders were sentenced to death. Since Drohiczyn was regarded in the 1950s as the hotbed of pro-Catholic and anti-Communist reaction, the authorities neglected the town and its development.

Recent period 
In 1991, the town was made the seat of the Roman Catholic Diocese of Drohiczyn as part of the newly created Roman Catholic Archdiocese of Białystok.

Churches 
In 1392, Władysław II Jagiełło founded a wooden Roman Catholic church in Drohiczyn. The church was replaced with a brick one in 1555. Burned by the Swedes in 1657, it was rebuilt in 1709.

References 

 Encyclopedia of Ukraine (online)
  
 http://www.jewishgen.org/yizkor/Drohiczyn/Drohiczyn.html
 http://kacper854.cba.pl/index_pliki/Page577.htm photos from Drohiczyn
 Drohiczyn – history, monuments, photographs

Cities and towns in Podlaskie Voivodeship
Siemiatycze County
Belsky Uyezd (Grodno Governorate)
Białystok Voivodeship (1919–1939)
Belastok Region
Podlachian Voivodeship
Holocaust locations in Poland